Joseph Leonard Kiser (born August 20, 1933) is a former Republican member of the North Carolina General Assembly, who represented the State of North Carolina's mountainous ninety-seventh House district, which mostly included Lincoln County. Mr. Kiser served in the State House from the late 1980s until 2009.

Joe Kiser served a term as Sheriff of Lincoln County before being elected to the State legislature. Mr. Kiser served seven terms in the North Carolina State House and is the former House Republican Leader. After 2008, Mr. Kiser did not run for re-election. He was succeeded by Jonathan Rhyne Jr.

Mr. Kiser is retired, and lives in Vale, North Carolina.

Electoral history

2006

2004

2002

2000

References

News & Observer blog: Kiser won't run again

External links

|-

|-

Living people
1933 births
People from Vale, Lincoln County, North Carolina
20th-century American politicians
21st-century American politicians
Republican Party members of the North Carolina House of Representatives